Vall d'Hebron is a neighborhood in the Horta-Guinardó district of Barcelona, Catalonia, Spain.

Four venues in the area hosted competitions for the 1992 Summer Olympics.

The Barcelona Metro line L3 stations of Vall d'Hebron, Montbau and Mundet are all situated on the northern boundary of the neighbourhood, under the Ronda de Dalt. Vall d'Hebron station is also served by line L5.

Despite its name, the Hospital Universitari Vall d'Hebron is not in the neighborhood of la Vall d'Hebron, but rather in the neighborhood of Montbau, on the other side of Ronda de Dalt. The hospital is a health campus that brings together four specialties: the university hospital, the research institute, the oncology institute and finally the Multiple Sclerosis Center of Catalonia.

See also 

 Urban planning of Barcelona

References

Vall d'Hebron, la
Vall d'Hebron, la